Zhang Xigang (born March 1962) is a Chinese bridge engineer who is the chief engineer of China Communications Construction. He is a member of the China Highway and Transportion Society (CHTS) and Chinese Civil Engineering Society (CCES).

Biography
Zhang was born in Xuchang, Henan, in March 1962.  After the resumption of National College Entrance Examination, he enrolled at Tongji University, where he obtained his bachelor of engineering degree in July 1983. He served in various posts in the CCCC Highway Consultants CO., Ltd. before serving as chief engineer of China Communications Construction.

Contributions
He was the chief architect of Sutong Yangtze River Bridge. He also participated in the design of Hangzhou Bay Bridge, Junshan Yangtze River Bridge, and Runyang Yangtze River Bridge.

Honours and awards
 December 30, 2016 "National Engineering Survey and Design Master" by the Ministry of Housing and Urban-Rural Development
 November 22, 2019 Member of the Chinese Academy of Engineering (CAE)

References

1957 births
Living people
People from Xuchang
Engineers from Henan
Tongji University alumni
Chinese bridge engineers
Chinese structural engineers
Members of the Chinese Academy of Engineering